The 2012 OFC Nations Cup was the ninth edition of the OFC Nations Cup organised by the Oceania Football Confederation (OFC). The group stage of the tournament also doubled as the second round of the OFC qualification tournament for the 2014 FIFA World Cup. The four semi-finalists advanced to the final round of OFC qualifying, where they would compete for the OFC spot in the inter-confederation play-offs. The qualifying tournament was to be the football competition at the 2011 Pacific Games in Nouméa, New Caledonia. However, in June 2011 the format was amended, and the Pacific Games were no longer part of the qualification process. The new structure saw four of the lowest ranked entrants play a single round-robin tournament from 22 to 26 November 2011 in Samoa. The winner of this qualifying stage joined the other seven teams that received a bye to the Nations Cup proper.

The main tournament was originally scheduled for Fiji from 3–12 June 2012, but in March 2012, Fiji was stripped of the hosting rights as a result of a legal dispute involving OFC general secretary Tai Nicholas and Fijian authorities. The tournament was then awarded to the Solomon Islands.

Tahiti defeated New Caledonia in the final 1–0, winning their first title, and also became the first team other than Australia (no longer part of OFC) and New Zealand to be crowned Oceania champions.

Host selection
On 30 July 2011 at the World Cup Preliminary Draw at Marina da Glória in Rio de Janeiro, Brazil, Fiji was confirmed as host of the 2012 OFC Nations Cup.  However, a legal dispute between OFC General Secretary Tai Nicholas and Fijian authorities saw the tournament hosting rights revoked on 14 March 2012.  This followed the stripping of both the men's and women's Olympic qualification tournaments from Fiji in January 2012.
On 28 March 2012 it was confirmed that the OFC Nations Cup 2012 would take place in Solomon Islands with the venue of Lawson Tama Stadium in Honiara.

Format
The eight second round teams competed in two round-robin groups of four. The eight teams were allocated to two pots of four teams based on the FIFA World Rankings of 27 July 2011, with the winner from Round One ranked 8th for this round. Teams ranked 1st – 4th were placed in Pot 1 with the remaining teams in Pot 2. Each group contained two teams from each of Pot 1 and Pot 2. Both group winners and runners-up advanced to the knockout stage and, separately, the third round of qualifying for the 2014 FIFA World Cup.

Qualification

For this edition of the OFC Nations Cup, there was a qualification tournament for the four lowest ranked teams according to the July 2011 FIFA World Rankings. The qualification contained the following teams:

The qualification tournament was played from 22 to 26 November 2011 in Samoa. The winner, Samoa qualified for the 2012 OFC Nations Cup.

Participating nations

Squads

Officials
Nine referees and nine assistant referees were named for the tournament.

Referees
 Andrew Achari (withdrew)
 Isidore Assiene-Ambassa
 Bruce George
 Norbert Hauata
 Chris Kerr
 Gerald Oiaka
 Peter O'Leary
 John Saohu
 Kader Zitouni

Assistant Referees
 Paul Ahupu
 David Charles (replaced by  Simon Lount)
 Jan-Hendrik Hintz
 Michael Joseph
 Ravinesh Kumar
 Tevita Makasini
 Jackson Namo
 Terry Piri
 Mark Rule

Venues
All matches were held at the Lawson Tama Stadium in Honiara.

Draw
The draw for the groups was held at the World Cup Preliminary Draw at the Marina da Glória in Rio de Janeiro, Brazil on 30 July 2011.

Seeding
Teams were seeded in two pots according to the July 2011 FIFA World Rankings, with Pot 1 containing the teams ranked 1–4 and Pot 2 the remaining automatic qualifiers as well as the eventual first round winner.  Each group contains two teams from Pot 1 and two teams from Pot 2.

† First round winner whose identity was not known at the time of the draw.

Group stage

If teams are even on points at the end of group play, the tied teams would be ranked by:
Goal difference in all group matches
Greater number of goals scored in all group matches
Greater number of points obtained in matches between the tied teams
Goal difference in matches between the tied teams
Greater number of goals scored in matches between the tied teams
Coin toss or drawing of lots
This was the same as the tiebreakers for 2014 FIFA World Cup qualification, except that drawing of lots was used instead of play-off match as the final tiebreaker.

Group A

Group B

Knockout stage
The group winners and runners-up competed in a single elimination knockout stage to determine the Oceania Nations Cup champion. These matches had no impact on World Cup qualifying, although the winner of this knockout stage earned a place in the 2013 FIFA Confederations Cup. These four teams all competed in the third round of Oceania World Cup qualification to determine who moved on to the inter-confederation play-offs and a chance to qualify for the World Cup finals tournament in Brazil. Unlike 2010 qualifying, the team that qualified for those playoffs could be different from the one that played in the 2013 FIFA Confederations Cup.

Semifinals

Third place match

Final

Goalscorers
There were 64 goals scored in 16 matches, for an average of 4 goals per match.
6 goals

 Jacques Haeko

5 goals

 Chris Wood
 Lorenzo Tehau

4 goals

 Bertrand Kaï
 Benjamin Totori
 Alvin Tehau
 Jonathan Tehau

3 goals

 Robert Tasso

2 goals

 Georges Gope-Fenepej
 Roy Kayara
 Shane Smeltz
 Steevy Chong Hue
 Teaonui Tehau
 Nicolas Vallar
 Jean Nako Naprapol

1 goal

 Maciu Dunadamu
 Marius Bako
 Kalaje Gnipate
 Judikael Ixoée
 Iamel Kabeu
 Dick Kauma
 Tommy Smith
 Niel Hans
 Kema Jack
 Silao Malo
 Himson Teleda
 Roihau Degage
 Brian Kaltack
 Derek Malas
 Freddy Vava

Awards
The following awards were given:
Golden Ball (best player):  Nicolas Vallar
Golden Boot (top scorer):  Jacques Haeko
Golden Glove (best goalkeeper):  Rocky Nyikeine
Fair Play Award:

Notes

References

External links
Results and schedule (FIFA.com version)
Results and schedule (oceaniafootball.com version)

 
Nations Cup, 2012
OFC Nations Cup tournaments
2nd Round
2012
2012 in Solomon Islands sport
OFC
June 2012 sports events in Oceania